is a 1996 Japanese comedy film directed by Sabu.

Cast
Shinichi Tsutsumi as Takeda
Tomorowo Taguchi as Yasuda
Diamond Yukai as Aizawa
Akaji Maro
Ren Osugi

References

External links

Japanese comedy films
1996 comedy films
Yakuza films
Films directed by Sabu
1996 directorial debut films
1996 films
1990s Japanese films